Guido Trento (June 21, 1892 – July 31, 1957) was an Italian stage and film actor.

Career
Trento appeared in over seventy films during his career, mainly in Italy during the silent era. In 1922 he appeared in Fox's Italian-shot historical epic Nero (1922). He followed it up with later roles for Fox such as Street Angel (1928). He emigrated to the United States, where he settled and died in 1957. His career largely tapered out following the arrival of sound.

His final screen appearance was in RKO Radio Pictures's B movie Secrets of the French Police (1932). Following America's entry into World War II, he was interned in Fort Missoula Internment Camp but released in 1943.

Selected filmography

 La vittima (1914)
 Amore e morte a Sorrento (1914)
 Un testamento (1914)
 Vette del Trentino (1915)
 Guerra redentrice (1915)
 Cento H.P. (1915)
 Il canto dell'agonia (1916)
 Il suicidio (1916)
 Il nemico occulto (1916)
 I novanta giorni (1916)
 Oltre i confini dell'anima (1917)
 Il buon ladrone (1917)
 La felicità (1917)
 La pecorella smarrita (1917)
 Maternità (1917)
 Le due orfanelle (1918)
 Maman Colibrì (1918) - Visconte Giorgio di Chambry
 Frou-Frou (1918) - Paolo Valréas
 La storia di un peccato (1918)
 L'orgoglio (1918)
 Una donna funesta (1918)
 Mademoiselle Monte Cristo (1918)
 L'ira (1918) - Arturo
 Lolita (1918)
 I nostri buoni villici (1918)
 L'accidia (1919) - engineer Ottavio Fortis
 L'invidia (1919) - Duque
 Il marito dell'amica (1919)
 The Race to the Throne (1919)
 Il principe Zilah (1919)
 Dora o Le spie (1919) - Michel Orloff
 Dopo il perdono (1919)
 Centocelle (1919)
 La lussuria (1919)
 La spada di Damocle (1919)
 L'idolo del dottore (1919)
 Il bacio di Dorina (1919)
 I cavalieri del poker (1919)
 La moglie scacciata (1919)
 La dame en gris (1919)
 L'autobus della morte (1919)
 La signora innamorata (1920)
 The Fear of Love (1920)
 La villa elettrica (1920)
 Il canto di Circe (1920)
 La povera piccola (1920)
 La beffa della vita (1920)
 Anna (1920)
 Plasmò... distrusse... (1920)
 Stella (1920)
 Il fiore del silenzio (1920)
 Voi! (1920)
 L'enigma di un processo celebre (1920)
 Il più forte (1921)
 Il mio carcere (1921)
 La gigolette (1921)
 L'oro e l'orpello (1922)
 Rabagas (1922)
 Idillio tragico (1922)
 Nero (1922) - Tullius
 L'ombra, la morte, l'uomo (1923)
 The Shepherd King (1923) - Saul
 La leggenda del Piave (1924)
 It Is the Law (1924) - Manee
 Street Angel (1928) - Neri -- Police Sergeant
 The Charge of the Gauchos (1928) - Monteros
 Il Grande Sentiero (1931) - Paolo Clark
 Pardon Us (1931) - Minor Role (uncredited)
 Secrets of the French Police (1932) - Count de Marsay (final film role)

References

Bibliography
 Holston, Kim R. Movie Roadshows: A History and Filmography of Reserved-Seat Limited Showings, 1911-1973. McFarland, 2012.
 Solomon, Aubrey. The Fox Film Corporation, 1915-1935: A History and Filmography. McFarland, 2011.

External links

1892 births
1957 deaths
Italian male film actors
Italian male silent film actors
Italian male stage actors
Italian emigrants to the United States
20th-century Italian male actors